Khan Mohammed Mustapha Khalid (popularly known as Mustapha Khalid Palash; born 11 September 1963) is a Bangladeshi architect. He is considered one of the leading contemporary architects of Bangladesh. He is also an artist, multi instrumentalist-singer and painter. He is the editor of quarterly DOT: Journal on Art & Architecture, one of the prominent architecture magazine of Bangladesh.

Early life and education
Palash was born to artist Afroz Mustapha (d. 2018). He received his bachelor of architecture from Bangladesh University of Engineering and Technology in 1988. After graduation, he taught there until 1998 as assistant professor. He also worked as a visiting faculty of architecture at University of Asia Pacific, AIUB, North South University, BRAC University

Career
Palash's constructions are noted for their contemporary 21st century modernist style, verging on experimentalism. His novel approaches towards architecture make him peerless or practically singular in the country. Palash has in his credential many local and international awards in recognition of his works. Currently Palash with Vistaara, is busy with quite a big number of corporate buildings and five star hotel projects.
As an architect, Palash usually concentrates on his city, Dhaka. The city's hustle and bustle, its architectural elements and vicariousness are also focused in his art works. Dhaka's raw structure and its compact atmosphere are captured in his works with liveliness and intimacy. Palash is considered one of very few celebrity architects of the country. He has participated several architectural exhibitions, seminars, workshops, architecture week, consultancies nationally and globally.

For the last two decades Palash with his team and his company Vistaara Architects, had created numerous outstanding architectural masterpieces in Dhaka, capital city of Bangladesh.

Attending Bangladesh University of Engineering and Technology for his bachelor's degree in Architecture from 1982 to 1988, he founded Vistraara Architects in 1994 and joined BUET in 1994, but gave up his job as an assistant professor in 1998 to pursue his passion full-time. Palash is a member of Institute of Architects Bangladesh, international associate member of AIA and a member of Council on Tall Buildings and Urban Habitat (CTBUH). He is also a member of the World Architecture Community and the Institute of Architects Bangladesh. Palash is the current elected president of Architecture Alumni Association of BUET (7th Executive Committee 2013 & 2014).

Notable architecture projects

Corporate Offices
 Grameenphone Corporate Headquarters
 Banglalink Head Office
 Robi Head Office
 Health Engineering Department (HED) Headquarters, Ministry of Health & Family Welfare
 Investment Corporation of Bangladesh (ICB) Headquarters
 EBL Headquarters
 Mobil House
 Rangs RD Square
 Jamuna Bank Ltd. Headquarters
 Bank Asia Headquarters
 Union Bank Headquarters
 Standard Bank Headquarters
 Uttara Motors Limited Headquarters
 Grand Delvistaa 
 Jamuna Gas Building
 Samsonite Tower

Malls and Centres
 Bashundhara City Shopping Complex
 Unique Trade Centre (UTC)
 Abdul Monem Financial District
 SPL Western Tower
 Bashundhara Fitness Center
 Shahara Centre
 Anabil Tower
 Rangs Babylonia
 BTI Landmark
 Rupayan Maxus
 Konik Tower
 Raffas Tower
 Samsonite Tower
 Elegant Tower
 Konka Jubilee Tower
 Palmal Tower
 Delvistaa Syed Villa
 Hosaf Tower
 Irving Rishta
 Shaptak Square
 RTV Studio
 Skylark Tower

Hotels and Hospitals
 Radisson Bay View Hotel Chittagong
 Hilton Dhaka
 The Westin Dhaka 
 Lab Aid Cardiac Care Hospital
 The Olives, Dhaka

Universities and Schools
 State University of Bangladesh
 American International School Dhaka (AISD)

Visual art
Besides being an architect, Palash is also an ardent painter. His solo painting exhibition titled Of Conflict and Harmony was held in 2009 at Gallery of Fine Arts of Asiatic Society, Dhaka. In June 2011 he had his third solo exhibition of Doodle Art titled Of Tears and Joyat Dhaka Art Centre.

From his childhood, art has been keenly connected with Palash's umbilical cord. As the son of a painter, he grew up in an artistic ambiance. During this time, he started to detect the imaginative world and documented his vision and observation.

When Palash feels saddened and his creative endeavour flourishes, brush and colours assist him to explore his inner vision. He records his pains, happiness and experiences through his canvas, which becomes a mirror of his pensive mood as reflected in his creative process. In the exposition, this is a clear statement about his aesthetic explorations. He is not concentrated on any particular theme, but nevertheless his themes are inextricably connected to each other. His paintings, done in oil and acrylic, feature various architectural designs or shapes. They as well plunge deep into Nature. He has complete freedom to identify himself for his working styles that are apparently synchronised and technically phenomenal. He wants to proceed with a certain style that can become a personal hallmark of his works.

Awards and recognition
 Shilpacharya Puroshkar (Award) for Fine Arts Architecture 2011
 Berger Commendation Award for Excellence in Architecture (Grameenphone House), 2011
 Institute of Architects Bangladesh (IAB) Design Award 1998
 Holcim Green Built Bangladesh Award, 2010
 Berger Award for Excellence in Architecture, 2007
 Architect of the Year Award, instituted by JK Lakshmi Cement, India

References

Further reading
 Creativity abound: Mustapha Khalid Palash, a multifaceted powerhouse
 Profile:Mustapha Khalid (1963)
 A Life In Versatility: Mustapha Khalid Palash is 52 today
 ARCHITECTURE: A career for future
 Bangladesh: Experts urge adoption of rainwater-harvesting to ease water crisis
 Profile of Bashundhara City by Architect Khalid
 Engrossment with architectural lines and shapes
 Mustapha Khalid Palash – Accomplished Artist and Architect

External links
Official Website of the Grand Delvista: Vistaara Architects 

1963 births
Living people
Bangladeshi architects
Bangladeshi painters
Bangladesh University of Engineering and Technology alumni